Cascade Locks is a city in Hood River County, Oregon, United States. The city got its name from a set of locks built to improve navigation past the Cascades Rapids of the Columbia River. The U.S. federal government approved the plan for the locks in 1875, construction began in 1878, and the locks were completed on November 5, 1896. The city population was 1,144 at the 2010 census.

Cascade Locks is just upstream from the Bridge of the Gods, a toll bridge that spans the Columbia River. It is the only bridge across the Columbia between Portland and Hood River. Cascade Locks is a few miles upstream of Eagle Creek Gorge, a popular scenic area that doubles as an alternate route for the Pacific Crest Trail. Cascade Locks is used frequently by hikers along the Pacific Crest Trail (PCT) to cross the Columbia River. Cascade Locks is the lowest point along the trail, which runs from the Mexico–US border in California to the Canada–US border in Washington, and the largest city directly on the trail.

Since 1999 the Confederated Tribes of Warm Springs have been pursuing an off-reservation casino to be sited in Cascade Locks. Since 2008 city officials have been pursuing an arrangement that would allow them to trade city well water for state-owned spring water and to sell it to Nestlé for bottling. In May 2016, Hood River County voters voted over 68% in favor to stop the project permanently.

Geography
Cascade Locks is in the northwest corner of Hood River County, on the south side of the Columbia River. It is bordered to the north (in the middle of the river) by Skamania County, Washington. The city of Stevenson, Washington, is north of Cascade Locks across the river.

U.S. Route 30 passes through the center of Cascade Locks as Wa Na Pa Street, joining Interstate 84 at the east and west end of the downtown. Both exits with I-84 are labeled "44". I-84 and US 30 lead east  to Hood River and west  to Portland. US 30 provides access to the Bridge of the Gods, a toll bridge which crosses the Columbia River to connect with Washington State Route 14 between North Bonneville and Stevenson.

Climate
This region experiences warm (but not hot) and dry summers, with no average monthly temperatures above . According to the Köppen climate classification system, Cascade Locks has a warm-summer Mediterranean climate which is abbreviated as "Csb" on climate maps.

Demographics

2010 census
As of the census of 2010, there were 1,144 people, 445 households, and 305 families residing in the city. The racial makeup of the city was 87.7% White, 0.5% African American, 1.8% Native American, 0.9% Asian, 0.6% Pacific Islander, 2.7% from other races, and 5.8% from two or more races. Hispanic or Latino of any race were 9.1% of the population.

There were 445 households, of which 30.3% had children under the age of 18 living with them, 47.2% were married couples living together, 13.7% had a female householder with no husband present, 7.6% had a male householder with no wife present, and 31.5% were non-families. 21.6% of all households were made up of individuals, and 7.4% had someone living alone who was 65 years of age or older. The average household size was 2.57 and the average family size was 2.95.

The median age in the city was 40.8 years. 20.8% of residents were under the age of 18; 10.3% were between the ages of 18 and 24; 24.4% were from 25 to 44; 32.9% were from 45 to 64; and 11.5% were 65 years of age or older. The gender makeup of the city was 51.5% male and 48.5% female.

Transportation
 Cascade Locks State Airport

US 30 runs through the city, and can be accessed by exit 44 from I-84. The Bridge of the Gods connects Cascade Locks to Washington State Route 14.

Columbia Area Transit and Skamania County Transit provide local and intercity bus service to surrounding communities.

See also

 List of cities in Oregon
 Cascade Locks and Canal, historical site after which the city is named
 Starvation Creek State Park

References

External links

 Entry for Cascade Locks in the Oregon Blue Book
 Cascade Locks Tourism
 Port of Cascade Locks
 

!colspan=3|Historic Columbia River Highway
|-
|align=center|Sheridan State Park<small>MP 44
|align=center|Cascade Locks<small>MP 45-46
|align=center|Herman Creek Bridge<small>MP 47.7

Cities in Oregon
Cities in Hood River County, Oregon
Columbia River Gorge
Historic Columbia River Highway
Oregon populated places on the Columbia River
Port cities in Oregon
1935 establishments in Oregon